Koffi Franck Kouao (born 20 May 1998) is an Ivorian professional footballer who plays as a defender for French  club Metz.

Club career
Kouao made his professional debut in the Segunda Liga for Vizela on 28 January 2017 in a game against Desportivo das Aves.

On 12 August 2022, Kouao signed a four-year contract with Metz in France.

Honours
Ivory Coast U23
Africa U-23 Cup of Nations: runner-up 2019

References

External links
 

1998 births
Living people
Ivorian footballers
Footballers from Abidjan
Association football defenders
Ivory Coast under-20 international footballers
Footballers at the 2020 Summer Olympics
Olympic footballers of Ivory Coast
F.C. Vizela players
Moreirense F.C. players
F.C. Famalicão players
FC Metz players
Primeira Liga players
Liga Portugal 2 players
Ivorian expatriate footballers
Ivorian expatriate sportspeople in Portugal
Expatriate footballers in Portugal
Ivorian expatriate sportspeople in France
Expatriate footballers in France